Dear Brat is a 1951 American comedy film directed by William A. Seiter and starring Mona Freeman and Billy De Wolfe. It is the third in a series following Dear Ruth (1947) and Dear Wife (1949).

Plot
Miriam Wilkins has founded an association for rehabilitation of former prisoners, and her father is unknowingly the group's honorary president. As convict Mr. Baxter is set free on parole, Miriam she sees an opportunity for action. She hires Baxter as a gardener, allowing him live in a room over the garage. However, Baxter's sentence had been imposed by Judge Wilkins, now a senator, causing the situation in the house to become chaotic.

Cast
 Mona Freeman as Miriam Wilkins
 Billy De Wolfe as Albert
 Edward Arnold as Senator Wilkins
 Lyle Bettger as Mr. Baxter
 Natalie Wood as Pauline

Production
In March 1950, Paramount announced a sequel to Dear Wife called Dear Mom. Arthur Sheekman and Jack Sher were assigned to write the script and Robert Welsch was to produce. In August, Norman Z. McLeod was suspended by Paramount for refusing to direct the film. That same month, the project was retitled Dear Brat. It was to be based on an original story by Deverey Freeman and produced by Mel Epstein. In October, Lyle Bettger was cast, but Joan Caulfield and William Holden, who had starred in Dear Ruth and Dear Wife, did not return. Filming began on October 20, with William Seiter as director, and was completed by the end of November.

Comic book adaption
 Eastern Color Movie Love #10 (August 1951)

References

External links
 
 

1951 films
1951 comedy films
American black-and-white films
American comedy films
American sequel films
1950s English-language films
Films adapted into comics
Films directed by William A. Seiter
Paramount Pictures films
1950s American films